Antonio Baldissera (Padua, 27 May 1838 – Florence, 8 January 1917) was an Italian general, active in the Ethiopian Empire (Abyssinia) and in Italian Eritrea during the late 19th and early 20th centuries.

Biography

Baldissera was born at Padua on May 27, 1838 and died at Florence, on January 9, 1917. His birthplace in 1858 being still under Austrian rule, young Baldissera entered the Austrian army, in which he served with distinction in an infantry regiment; he was captain in the "7th Jägers" at Custoza (1866). When Venetia became Italian, he opted for Italian nationality, retaining his rank in the Italian army. In 1879 he was promoted colonel of the 7th Bersaglieri.

In 1887, he was promoted to major General and went to Eritrea under General Alessandro Asinari di San Marzano, remaining in the colony as governor after the latter's return. Both as a soldier and an administrator he showed high qualities. He occupied Asmara, Keren and other territories, defeated the armies of Ras Alula, and had planned still further extensions of Italian dominion, profiting by the anarchy of Abyssinia. He organized the admirable native troops (Askari), developed agriculture and built roads. But owing to a disagreement with the Italian Government over his Abyssinian policy, he asked for and obtained his recall after two years of successful activity.

In 1892 he was promoted lieutenant general. When the war with Abyssinia broke out in 1895 the then Governor of the colony, General Oreste Baratieri, did not enjoy the confidence of the Italian government, which decided to send out Baldissera once more. Although the appointment was kept secret, Baratieri got wind of it, and this probably decided him to attack the enemy with an inferior force and insufficient supplies, hoping to win glory for himself before his successor's arrival. The result was the disaster of Adwa (March 1, 1896).

When Baldissera arrived, he found a defeated and demoralized army, and the victorious enemy advancing in force. With lightning speed, he reorganized the remains of Baratieri's army and the reinforcements just landed, freed the beleaguered garrisons of Cassale and Adigrat, drove back King Menelek II's army and reoccupied a large part of the lost territory. But peace was concluded before he had completely retrieved the defeat of Adwa, and he was forced to limit his activities to the internal reorganization of Eritrea. But even this task he could not carry out as thoroughly as he wished owing to the opposition of the home government, which was tired of African affairs.

In 1897 Baldissera returned to Italy and resumed his duties in the home army, successively commanding the VII and VIII Army Corps. In 1906 he was made a senator. In 1908 he had to retire from the army under the age limit.

Antonio Baldissera died in Florence on January 8, 1917.

Castellini Baldissera Family 
The Baldissera family married into the Castellini family at the end of the nineteenth century, forming the Castellini Baldissera. The family owns a number of ancestral villas and palazzos in and around Milan, as well as Villa Castellini on Lago Maggiore.

Works
Antonio Baldissera wrote about colonial administration & history 2 books:
Relazione sulla occupazione dell'Asmara, Voghera-Roma 1889
Relazione sulle operazioni nel 2º, periodo della Campagna d'Africa. 1895-96 (in "Rivista militare italiana", 16 August an 1 September 1896)

Notes

References

1838 births
1917 deaths
Italian colonial governors and administrators
Italian military personnel in Austrian armies
History of Ethiopia
Italian generals
Italian military personnel of the First Italo-Ethiopian War
People from Padua